Tempest is a 1928 feature silent film directed by Sam Taylor. V. I. Nemirovich-Dantchenko wrote the screenplay and William Cameron Menzies won an Academy Award for Best Art Direction for his work in the film in 1929, the first year of the awards ceremony. John Barrymore and Camilla Horn star in the film, with Louis Wolheim co-starring.

Preserved by two US archives George Eastman House and UCLA Film and TV.

Plot
The film is set during final days of Czarist Russia and revolves around a peasant who rises through the ranks of the Russian army ending up a lieutenant. His life is made increasingly difficult by the aristocrats and officers around him who are resentful of his progress. He then finds himself rejected by a princess he falls in love with and, having been caught in her room, is put in prison. There he is stripped of his rank, but soon after the Russian Civil War starts, and as a result of the Red Terror, the tables are turned.

Cast
 John Barrymore as Sgt. Ivan Markov
 Camilla Horn as Princess Tamara
 Louis Wolheim as Sgt. Bulba
 Boris de Fast as Peddler / Commissar
 George Fawcett as General
 Ullrich Haupt as Captain
 Michael Visaroff as Guard

Accolades
The film won the first Academy Award for Production Design along with 1927's The Dove as both were designed by William Cameron Menzies. The award was originally called Best Interior Decoration.

References

External links

Tempest at SilentEra
Tempest at Virtual History

1928 films
1928 drama films
Films whose art director won the Best Art Direction Academy Award
American black-and-white films
Silent American drama films
1920s English-language films
American silent feature films
Films directed by Lewis Milestone 
Films directed by Sam Taylor
Films produced by Joseph M. Schenck
Russian Revolution films
Films directed by Victor Tourjansky
1920s American films